Carabus faminii is a species of ground beetle in the Carabinae subfamily that is endemic to Sicily.

References

Further reading
Biological cycle and morphological descriptions: 

faminii
Beetles described in 1837
Endemic fauna of Sicily
Beetles of Europe